José Eduardo Pérez Ferrada (born 28 July 1985) is a Chilean footballer as an attacking midfielder.

Career
After playing several years in the Chilean Primera División, Perez signed with Mexican Primera División side Querétaro F.C. on a six-month loan in December 2011.

References

External links
José Pérez at Football Lineups

1985 births
Living people
Sportspeople from Concepción, Chile
Chilean footballers
Chilean expatriate footballers
C.D. Arturo Fernández Vial footballers
C.D. Huachipato footballers
Unión Española footballers
Querétaro F.C. footballers
Cobreloa footballers
Universidad de Concepción footballers
Rangers de Talca footballers
Puerto Montt footballers
Chilean Primera División players
Ascenso MX players
Primera B de Chile players
Liga MX players
Expatriate footballers in Mexico
Chilean expatriate sportspeople in Mexico
Association football midfielders